Katela is a village in Sõmeru Parish, Lääne-Viru County, in northeastern Estonia.
The town is about 58 mi (or 94 km) east of Tallinn. It is the Birth Place of Estonian Writer Jüri Parijõgi.

References

Villages in Lääne-Viru County